The Bubye River, also known as Bubi River, is a tributary of the Limpopo River in Beitbridge District and Gwanda District, Zimbabwe. Its course forms part of the border between Mberengwa and Mwenezi districts.

Tigerfish occur naturally in this river.

Dams
Formerly there were no major dams on the river.
The Bubi-Lupane Dam was built in 2010 in order to supply water to Lupane District.

References

External links
IDBZ - Water

Beitbridge District
Gwanda District
Geography of Matabeleland South Province
Tributaries of the Limpopo River
Rivers of Zimbabwe